The Church St. Dimitrija is an Eastern Orthodox church in Bajlovce, Kumanovo, North Macedonia.

References

Kumanovo Municipality
Eastern Orthodox church buildings in North Macedonia
Macedonian Orthodox churches